Pavel Galac (born 6 September 1995) is a Moldovan footballer who plays as a goalkeeper for Moldovan club CSF Spartanii Selemet.

References

External links
 
 

Living people
1995 births
Moldovan footballers
Association football goalkeepers
FC Sheriff Tiraspol players
CS Petrocub Hîncești players
FC Ungheni players
FC Victoria Bardar players
FC Anker Wismar players
Moldovan Super Liga players
Oberliga (football) players
Moldova youth international footballers
Moldovan expatriate footballers
Expatriate footballers in Germany
Moldovan expatriate sportspeople in Germany